"Hunting High and Low" is a song by Norwegian band A-ha, released in June 1986 as the fifth and final single from the band's debut studio album of the same name (1985).

Release and reception
"Hunting High and Low" was released in the summer of 1986 and became the third most successful single from Hunting High and Low on the charts and one of the band's most recognizable and popular songs. The song did not chart in the United States, but reached the top five in the United Kingdom and Ireland.

The original album version was produced by Tony Mansfield and is played with synthesizers. For its single release, the track was remixed, containing additional production by Alan Tarney and features an orchestra.

Music video 
This was the last video from the band's debut album which was directed by Steve Barron.

The UK TV show Blue Peter featured a making-of-the-video special on "Hunting High and Low" to demonstrate the morphing effects of Morten into animals. 
 
The video starts with a lonely Morten walking across a snowy landscape which then cuts to a silhouette of the band in a studio with Morten on Vocals, Mags on Piano and Pål on Guitar. The film then cuts back to show Morten turn into an Eagle using animation and fly off across the snowscape into a city.
With the orchestral part of the song starting the video then goes back to the silhouettes of the band, this time with an orchestra animated like a rotoscope.

With Morten now back again as a human he is seen standing on top of a cliff face about to dive off of it. When he does he turns into a shark and swims off across the ocean. As the film continues, a woman is shown on a beach who sees the shark and steps into the water. All of a sudden two hunters spear the shark and try to drag it onto the beach. As they do so, the shark turns into a lion and runs off into the wilderness.
As the film moves toward the end, the silhouettes of Morten, Magne and Pal become full colour ... and a hunter is seen lining up the lion in his sights, about to shoot. The woman from the beach stops the hunter.

The basic idea behind the video is that love brings a man back in various forms to be near the woman he loves. The music video was uploaded on A-Ha YouTube Channel on the 5 November 2010, The video as gained more than 54Million (54,730,070) views as at July 2nd.

Formats and track listing

7": Warner Bros. / W 6663 (UK) 
Side one
 "Hunting High and Low" (Remix) - 3:45 
Side two
 "The Blue Sky" (Demo Version) - 3:12
 Track 1 is produced by Tony Mansfield, additional production by Alan Tarney.

12": Warner Bros. / W 6663T (UK) 
Side one
 "Hunting High and Low" (Extended Version) - 6:03
Side two
 "Hunting High and Low" (Remix) - 3:45
 "The Blue Sky" (Demo Version) - 3:12
 Track 1 is produced by Tony Mansfield, additional production by Alan Tarney.

7": Warner Bros. / 9 28684-7 (US)  
Side one
 "Hunting High and Low" (Remix) - 3:45
Side two
 "And You Tell Me" (Demo Version) - 1:52
 Track 1 is produced by Tony Mansfield, additional production by Alan Tarney.

12": Warner Bros. / 9 20478-0 (US)  
Side one
 "Hunting High and Low" (Extended Remix) - 6:03
Side two
 "Train of Thought" (Reflection Mix) - 7:00
 "And You Tell Me" (Demo Version) - 1:52

 Track 1 is the same version as the "Extended Version", produced by Tony Mansfield, additional production by Alan Tarney.
 "Train of Thought" (Reflection Mix) is the same version as the "Steve Thompson Mix" & "The U.S. Mix".

Charts

Weekly charts

Year-end charts

MTV Unplugged appearance 
In 2017, A-ha appeared on the television series MTV Unplugged and played and recorded acoustic versions of many of their popular songs for the album MTV Unplugged – Summer Solstice in Giske, Norway, including "Hunting High and Low".

References

1985 songs
1986 singles
A-ha songs
Music videos directed by Steve Barron
Song recordings produced by Tony Mansfield
Song recordings produced by Alan Tarney
Songs written by Paul Waaktaar-Savoy
Warner Records singles